Platonychia is characterized by an abnormally flat and broad nail, and may be seen as part of an autosomal-dominant condition in which multiple nail abnormalities are present in many members of a large family. Seen in iron deficiency condition.

See also
Nail anatomy

References

 
Conditions of the skin appendages